Eóin Ó Cuileannáin, S.T.D. (anglicised John O'Cullenan; –1661) was an Irish Roman Catholic prelate who served as the Bishop of Raphoe from 1625 to 1661.

After having been held in prison in Derry for several years, Bishop Ó Cuileannáin went into exile in March 1653.

Eóin Ó Cuileannáin died in Brussels on 24 March 1661, aged about 78, and was interred in the chapel of the Virgin in the Cathedral of St. Michael and St. Gudula.

Notes

References 

 
 
 

1580s births
People from County Tyrone
16th-century Irish Roman Catholic priests
17th-century Roman Catholic bishops in Ireland
Roman Catholic bishops of Raphoe
1661 deaths
People from County Donegal